{{DISPLAYTITLE:Histamine H4 receptor}}

The histamine H4 receptor, like the other three histamine receptors, is a member of the G protein-coupled receptor superfamily that in humans is encoded by the HRH4 gene.

Discovery
Unlike the histamine receptors discovered earlier, H4 was found in 2000 through a search of the human genomic DNA data base.

Tissue distribution
H4 is highly expressed in bone marrow and white blood cells and regulates neutrophil release from bone marrow and subsequent infiltration in the zymosan-induced pleurisy mouse model. It was also found that H4R exhibits a uniform expression pattern in the human oral epithelium.

Function
The Histamine H4 receptor has been shown to be involved in mediating eosinophil shape change and mast cell chemotaxis. This occurs via the βγ subunit acting at phospholipase C to cause actin polymerization and eventually chemotaxis.

Structure
The 3D structure of the H4 receptor has not been solved yet due to the difficulties of GPCR crystallization. Some attempts have been made to develop structural models of the H4 receptor for different purposes. The first H4 receptor model was built by homology modelling based on the crystal structure of bovine rhodopsin. This model was used for the interpretation of site-directed mutagenesis data, which revealed the crucial importance of Asp94 (3.32) and Glu182 (5.46) residues in ligand binding and receptor activation.

A second rhodopsin based structural model of the H4 receptor was successfully used for the identification of novel H4 ligands.

Recent advancements in GPCR crystallization, in particular the determination of the human histamine H1 receptor in complex with doxepin will likely increase the quality of novel structural H4 receptor models.

Ligands

Agonists
 4-Methylhistamine
 VUF-8430 (2-[(Aminoiminomethyl)amino]ethyl carbamimidothioic acid ester)
 OUP-16
 Clozapine
 JNJ 28610244

Antagonists
 Toreforant (JNJ 38518168)
Mianserin (also a H1 and H3 antagonist)
 Thioperamide (also a selective H3 antagonist)
 JNJ 7777120 (discontinued)
 JNJ 39758979 (discontinued)
 ZPL389
 VUF-6002 (1-[(5-Chloro-1H-benzimidazol-2-yl)carbonyl]-4-methylpiperazine)
 A987306
 A943931
 Pimozide

Therapeutic potential
H4 receptor antagonists could be used to treat asthma and allergies.

The highly selective histamine H4 antagonist VUF-6002 is orally active and inhibits the activity of both mast cells and eosinophils in vivo, and has anti-inflammatory and antihyperalgesic effects.

See also
 Histamine H1-receptor
 Histamine H2-receptor
 Histamine H3-receptor

References

External links

Histamine receptors